Michael U. Villarreal (born August 19, 1971 in San Antonio) is an American state politician who served as a member of the Texas House of Representatives from a district centered in north central San Antonio. Villarreal served as Chair of the House Committee on Investments and Financial Services and was a member of the House Committee on Public Education. A Democrat who served eight terms, Villarreal previously worked for San Antonio's SAMCO Capitol Markets, specializing in municipal finance.

Background
Villarrea is a graduate of Central Catholic High School in San Antonio, Texas. He holds an undergraduate economics degree from Texas A&M University and later studied economics at Massachusetts Institute of Technology and Harvard University. He holds a Masters of Public Policy from Harvard Kennedy School. He is currently pursuing a doctorate in public affairs at the Lyndon B. Johnson School of Public Affairs.

Villarreal was named as one of Texas' best legislators by Texas Monthly and has been commended by the local Sierra Club for his legislative work to protect the environment.

Villarreal resigned his seat in the State House in January 2015 to run for Mayor of San Antonio in the 2015 mayoral election. Villarreal came in third and did not qualify for the runoff.

References

External links
 Representative's website
 State House page
 ballotpedia.org

1971 births
Living people
Harvard Kennedy School alumni
Democratic Party members of the Texas House of Representatives
Hispanic and Latino American state legislators in Texas
People from San Antonio
Texas A&M University alumni
21st-century American politicians